Adalberto Campos Fernandes (born 1958) is a Portuguese politician who served as Minister of Health from 26 November 2015 to 15 October 2018. Fernandes graduated with a PhD in health administration from the University of Lisbon and is a professor at the New University of Lisbon.

References

1958 births
Living people
Portuguese politicians
Health ministers of Portugal
People from Lisbon